The Mexican spotted wood turtle (Rhinoclemmys rubida) or Mexican spotted terrapin is a species of turtle in the family Geoemydidae.

It is endemic to Mexico. It inhabits the Pacific slope of southern Mexico, from sea level to 1350 meters elevation.

There are two recognized subspecies. R. rubida rubida ranges inhabits Oaxaca and Chiapas, and R. rubida perixantha inhabits Jalisco, Colima, Michoacán, and Guerrero.

References

Rhinoclemmys
Turtles of North America
Endemic reptiles of Mexico
Jalisco dry forests
Fauna of the Southern Pacific dry forests
Near threatened biota of Mexico
Near threatened fauna of North America
Reptiles described in 1869
Taxonomy articles created by Polbot